McKnight–Westwinds station is a CTrain light rail station in Calgary, Alberta, Canada. It serves the North-East Line (Route 202) and opened in 2007 as part of the line's first extension.  It was the northern terminus of the line until Martindale station opened in 2012.

The station is located on an exclusive LRT right of way, north of the interchange at McKnight Boulevard and Métis Trail (formerly 44th St. NE). The station is 13 km from the City Hall Interlocking. 949 spaces are included at the stop, which is designed for commuter access. The station was only the terminus for less than five years, however, as a further extension (3.1 km) of the Northeast line to Saddle Ridge (originally planned to be complete by 2011) was approved in November 2007. The extension was opened on August 27, 2012, at the cost of $110 million. In the first year after the extension was completed, McKnight-Westwinds served average of 11,420 boardings per day. 

The station consists of a centre-loading, walk-on platform without stairs.  It is very similar to Somerset-Bridlewood station and the Saddletowne station, which opened in 2012.  McKnight-Westwinds is the first station on the Northeast line that is not located in the median of a roadway.

Constructed along with the McKnight-Westwinds station, is the Oliver Bowen Maintenance Facility, located just South of the station. This facility is not only used for the maintenance of the fleet, but also has storage space for another 65 LRVs (light rail vehicles). This helps in the storage of the 22 additional LRVs that are planned to be purchased within the current 20-year capital plan. Previous to the 2007 extension, all NE LRVs had to come up from Anderson or Haysboro every morning. With the opening of OBMF, NE LRVs can stay on the NE line. Siemens U2s operating on the NW line provide service to Whitehorn or Saddletowne before going out of service for maintenance and then return to the NW line providing service from Whitehorn to Tuscany, before resuming regular operations.

References

CTrain stations
Railway stations in Canada opened in 2007
Calgary International Airport